Poecilasthena prouti is a moth in the family Geometridae. It is found in the Philippines (Luzon).

References

Moths described in 1929
Poecilasthena
Moths of Asia